Whittell can refer to:

People

 Crispin Whittell (born 1969), British director and playwright
 Giles Whittell (contemporary), English author and journalist
 H. T. Whittell (1826–1899), medical doctor in South Australia and Adelaide's City Coroner
 Hubert Whittell OBE (1883 – 1954), British army officer, Australian ornithologist
 Josephine Whittell (1883 – 1961), American character actress

Other uses

 George Whittell High School, high school in Zephyr Cove, Nevada
 George Whittell, American businessman, for whom the high school is named